Pterocoma is an extinct genus of crinoids from the Late Jurassic of Europe.

References

Sources
 Fossils (Smithsonian Handbooks) by David Ward (Page 171)

External links
Pterocoma in the Paleobiology Database

Comatulida
Prehistoric crinoid genera
Jurassic crinoids
Jurassic animals of Europe